In enzymology, a 5-pyridoxate dioxygenase is an enzyme that catalyzes the chemical reaction

3-hydroxy-4-hydroxymethyl-2-methylpyridine-5-carboxylate + NADPH + H+ + O2  2-(acetamidomethylene)-3-(hydroxymethyl)succinate + NADP+

The 4 substrates of this enzyme are 3-hydroxy-4-hydroxymethyl-2-methylpyridine-5-carboxylate, NADPH, H+, and O2, whereas its two products are 2-(acetamidomethylene)-3-(hydroxymethyl)succinate and NADP+.

This enzyme belongs to the family of oxidoreductases, specifically those acting on paired donors, with O2 as oxidant and incorporation or reduction of oxygen. The oxygen incorporated need not be derived from O2 with NADH or NADPH as one donor, and incorporation of two atoms o oxygen into the other donor.  The systematic name of this enzyme class is 5-pyridoxate,NADPH:oxygen oxidoreductase (decyclizing). This enzyme is also called 5-pyridoxate oxidase.  This enzyme participates in vitamin B6 metabolism.  It has 2 cofactors: FAD,  and Flavoprotein.

References

 

EC 1.14.12
NADPH-dependent enzymes
Flavoproteins
Enzymes of unknown structure